Khin Ma Hnaung was a queen consort of King Raza II of Arakan from 1599 to 1612. The queen was a daughter of King Nanda of Toungoo Dynasty and his chief consort Hanthawaddy Mibaya. She was taken to Mrauk-U, after her father surrendered to the joint forces of Raza II and Minye Thihathu II of Toungoo in 1599. At Mrauk-U, she was known as the Tanzaung Mibara (တန်ဆောင်း မိဖုရား, "Queen of the Royal Hall").

Family  

The queen has a daughter named Thupa-Ba Déwi (သုပဘာ ဒေဝီ), born in the year 1603 right after lost image of Buddha was founded by fishermens and they notified the King. Which Buddha image was traced back to the timeline during reign of Mahataing Sanda who was the founder of Waithali Dynasty, his queen was Thubapa Déwi who ordered the Buddha Statue retrieved from India. On its way to the capital, raft carrying the statue accidentally sunken and was lost. However, the queen asked her husband to make copy of The Great Vesali Image. 

Original Statue was now preserved and the King Raza II accompanied by his retinue and ministers along with his pregnant wife. He named his newborn baby princess linking her to the story of the queen and the lost image of Buddha.

Ancestry
Khin Ma Hnaung was the fourth child of Nanda and his chief consort Hanthawaddy Mibaya. She was likely born in the early 1560s.

Notes

References

Bibliography
 
 
 
 

Queens consort of Mrauk-U